Satyakam is a 1969 Indian drama film directed by Hrishikesh Mukherjee, based on a Bengali novel of the same name by Narayan Sanyal. The film stars Dharmendra, Sharmila Tagore, Sanjeev Kumar, and Ashok Kumar. The film was scored by Laxmikant Pyarelal. The name of the film is taken from ancient Hindu saint Satyakama Jabala.

The character played by Dharmendra is considered to be among the finest in Indian Cinema. It won the 1971 Filmfare Best Dialogue Award for Rajinder Singh Bedi. The movie also won National Film Award For Best Feature Film in Hindi. The film was remade in Tamil as Punnagai (1971) by K. Balachander.

Plot
Satyapriya Acharya is a man of principles and truth. His views and way of life were guided by his ascetic grandfather "Daddaji" Satyasharan Acharya. Armed with an engineering degree, Satyapriya ventures out to realize his dreams about building a new India, but encounters characters who share little of his ideals. During his first assignment, he meets Ranjana, who is about to be sexually exploited by a debauching prince, his employer. Fully aware that Ranjana loves him, Satyapriya hesitates in rescuing her and lets her become prey of the morally corrupt prince. The incident shakes the moral foundation of Satyapriya, who has betrayed his conscience and feelings. To redress the mounting guilt, he marries Ranjana, but their lives are the never same again. She bears a child whose paternity is never clearly established. Later, Satyapriya moves from one job to another as he is unable to make dishonest compromises. Satyapriya and Ranjana also have their share of marital conflicts. She tries to lead a normal life and longs to forget her past. Satyapriya is constantly reminded of his failure and appears to make up for it by increasing rigidity about applying his principles in real life.

Struggling professionally, he is struck by an incurable and fatal illness. In the end, hospitalised and unable to even speak, Satyapriya is pursued by an unscrupulous contractor seeking approval for a badly executed civil project, in lieu of which the contractor would give him substantial sum that would take care of Satyapriya's wife Ranjana and their child after his death. Satyapriya has no means to secure his family's future and in the very first compromise of his life, Satyapriya hands over the signed approval papers to his wife. Although Ranjana had suffered many hardships and is not entirely happy with Satyapriya's redder-than-rose approach to life, she does not want to see him falter at the end stage of his life. She tears apart the documents and finds him smiling at her. Although unable to speak, Satyapriya is clearly happy that he was able to convert at least one person to his idealist worldview.

On learning of Satyapriya's condition, his grandfather "Daddaji" comes visiting. He had earlier turned his back on Satyapriya for marrying a woman without his consent and according to him, of questionable background.  Well versed in religious philosophy, the grandfather offers words of wisdom to Satyapriya. He tells Satyapriya that being aware of ideas like impermanence of worldly life and the larger divine truth, Satyaprakash is morally equipped to confidently face death. After his passing, the grandfather says that he would perform the last rites because of the questionable paternity of his grandson. At that moment Satyapriya and Ranjana's child publicly speaks the truth saying the real reason for his not performing the last rites is because he is not the biological son. The grandfather is humbled by the fact that he who swore by fidelity to truth regardless of the consequences, could not practice it except in isolation of his Gurukula, where he was not being tested. Yet his granddaughter-in-law could share this issue with her child and the child could speak about it in public, even though it was uncomfortable and would translate into taunts and humiliation from rest of the world. The grandfather publicly acknowledges his failings that even though he has spent his whole life studying religious scriptures and philosophical books as well as practising many rituals, he still had much to learn about the nature of truth. He drinks water from the hands of the son and lets go of his prejudices. The film ends with him departing for home with Ranjana and her child.

Cast
 Dharmendra as Satyapriya 'Sath' Acharya 
 Sharmila Tagore as Ranjana
 Ashok Kumar as Satyasharan 'Daddaji' Acharya 
 Sanjeev Kumar as Narendra 'Naren' Sharma 
 David as Rustom
 Sarika as Kabul S. Archarya (credited as Baby Sarika)
 Tarun Bose as Mr. Ladia
 Asrani as Peter
 Dina Pathak as Harbhajan's mother 
 Manmohan as Kunver Vikram Singh
 Rabi Ghosh as Ananto Chatterjee
 Baldev Khosa
 Sapru as Deewan Bajridhar Talwar
 Uma Dutt as Chief Engineer
 Rajan Haksar as Shyam Sunder
 Dev Kishan as Shiv Nandan

Songs
The music of the film was composed by Laxmikant–Pyarelal and lyrics by Kaifi Azmi.

References

External links
 

1969 films
1960s Hindi-language films
Films directed by Hrishikesh Mukherjee
Films scored by Laxmikant–Pyarelal
Indian drama films
Hindi films remade in other languages
Best Hindi Feature Film National Film Award winners
1969 drama films
Hindi-language drama films
Films set in Jamshedpur
Films based on works by Narayan Sanyal